The Tongling Yangtze River Road-railway Bridge is a bridge across the Yangtze River located in Anhui, China.

History 
The bridge opened with the Hefei–Fuzhou high-speed railway on 28 June 2015.

Design 
On its upper deck it carries a six-lane expressway. On its lower deck it carries the double-track Hefei–Fuzhou high-speed railway and the single-track Lujiang–Tongling railway. There is provision for the line to be upgraded to double-track in the future.

References 

Bridges completed in 2015
Road-rail bridges in China
Bridges over the Yangtze River
Bridges in Anhui